Sviatoslav III Igorevich (1176 – September 1211) was a Rus' prince (a member of the Rurik dynasty).

Marriage and children
In October, 1188 he married Yaroslava Rurikovna, a daughter of prince Rurik Rostislavich of Belgorod by his wife Anna Yurevna of Turov.
Agafia of Rus (after 1188 - after 31 August 1247), wife of Konrad I of Masovia.

Ancestors

Footnotes

Sources
Benda, Kálmán (General Editor): Magyarország történeti kronológiája - I. kötet: A kezdetektől 1526-ig /A Historical Chronology of Hungary - Volume I: From the Beginnings to 1526/; Akadémiai Kiadó, 1981, Budapest;  (the part of the book which describes the events of the period from 1197 to 1309 was written by László Solymosi).
Dimnik, Martin: The Dynasty of Chernigov - 1146-1246; Cambridge University Press, 2003, Cambridge; .

1176 births
1211 deaths
Olgovichi family
Princes of Vladimir-in-Volhynia
Eastern Orthodox monarchs